Fictional colleges are found in many modern novels, films, and other works of fiction, probably because they allow the author greater licence for invention and a reduced risk of being accused of libel or slander, as might happen if the author depicted unsavory events as occurring at a real-life institution. Below is a list of some of the fictional colleges of the University of Oxford.

His Dark Materials
Philip Pullman's His Dark Materials novels feature a number of fictional Oxford colleges, most notably Jordan College, including:
Broadgates Hall College
Cardinal's College
Foxe College
Gabriel College
Jordan College
Queen Philippa's College
St Michael's College
St Scholastica's College
St Sophia's College
Wordsworth College
Wykeham College

Inspector Morse
The Inspector Morse series of books by Colin Dexter is predominantly set within Oxford and its environs, including the University. Consequently, many fictional colleges are named. The derived television series, Inspector Morse, Lewis and Endeavour, continued this practice.

T=TV series

Jude the Obscure
Thomas Hardy's novel Jude the Obscure is set in Christminster, "Wessex", a thinly fictionalized version of Oxford, and mentions the following colleges of Christminster University:
Biblioll College (Balliol)
Cardinal College (Christ Church)
Crozier College (Oriel?)
Oldgate College (New College) 
Rubric College (Brasenose?)
Sarcophagus College
Tudor College

Loss and Gain
Loss and Gain by St John Henry Newman tells the story of the conversion of Charles Reding, an Oxford student, to Catholicism. In the novel, Newman creates the following colleges:

Saint Saviour's (the college of the main character, Charles Reding)
All Saints
Leicester College
Nun's Hall

Other works

Fictional library
 In Ben Aaronovitch's Rivers of London series, Oxford's Bodleian Library has a secret part, known and accessible only to practitioners of Magic and containing among other things the secret writings of Isaac Newton on this subject.

See also
Colleges of the University of Oxford
List of fictional Cambridge colleges
List of fictional Oxbridge colleges
School and university in literature
List of books about Oxford

References

Fictional
Fictional universities and colleges
Lists of fictional locations
University of Oxford in fiction
Fictional colleges